Micronola wadicola is a moth of the family Erebidae first described by Hans Georg Amsel in 1935. It is found in Jordan, south-western Iran, south-western Saudi Arabia, Oman and Yemen.

The wingspan is 9–13 mm. The head, patagia and first part of the thorax are grey. The posterior part of the thorax and the ground colour of the forewings (including fringes) is beige. The crosslines are black. The hindwings are whitish beige and the abdomen is beige (although the anal tuft in the female is bright yellow). The underside is unicolourous whitish beige. There is no discal spot on the hindwing.

The habitats consists of warm, dry areas in desertlike open grassland with herbaceous plants and rocky biotopes with scattered trees. Adults are on wing at night and have been observed in all months except June, August, September and December. There are probably multiple generations per year.

The larval host plants are unknown, but they possibly feed on fungus species. The larvae are very narrow, transparent and have a large head.

References

Micronoctuidae
Invertebrates of the Arabian Peninsula
Moths described in 1935